Dzambolat Anatolyevich Tsallagov (born 1 January 2000) is a Russian football player. He plays for FC Kuban Krasnodar.

Club career
He made his debut in the Russian Professional Football League for FC Kazanka Moscow on 1 August 2019 in a game against FC Olimp Khimki.

He made his debut in the A Lyga for DFK Dainava on 2 April 2021 in a game against FK Riteriai.

On 12 July 2022, Tsallagov signed a two-year contract (with an option for third year) with Russian Premier League club FC Torpedo Moscow. He made his RPL debut for Torpedo on 24 July 2022 against FC Dynamo Moscow. His Torpedo contract was terminated by mutual consent on 5 September 2022.

Personal life
He is a cousin of Ibragim Tsallagov.

Career statistics

References

External links
 
 Profile by Russian Football National League

2000 births
Sportspeople from Vladikavkaz
Living people
Russian footballers
Association football midfielders
FK Dainava Alytus players
FC SKA-Khabarovsk players
FC Torpedo Moscow players
FC Urozhay Krasnodar players
Russian Second League players
A Lyga players
Russian First League players
Russian Premier League players
Russian expatriate footballers
Expatriate footballers in Lithuania
Russian expatriate sportspeople in Lithuania